Roger Frogley (1908 in Ware, Hertfordshire - 1974) was a pioneering British motorcycle speedway rider. His crowning triumph was beating the Australian star, Ben Unwin, at the International Match Race in front of a 40,000 strong crowd.

Frogley rode for the Crystal Palace Glaziers the majority of his career. He made his debut on 14 April 1928 at High Beach motorcycle speedway located inside of Epping Forest, England; the track was behind The King's Oak public house.  A special trophy was put forth that year for the first, fourth place riders to win races at more than 39 mph. The trophies were won by Roger, his brother Buster, Joe Francis, and Arthur Willimott.

Roger and Buster Frogley rode modified 1928 Dirt Track Rudge motor bikes.

In 1929, Roger Frogley rode in forty races, winning eighteen of them. Most significantly, he won the "Home" Star Riders' Championship at Wimbledon on Monday 21 October, making him the first British Star Rider.

Roger Frogley was the top scoring rider for England, with six points, in the first England versus Australia Test Match at Wimbledon Stadium, Plough Lane, in 1930.

He retired in 1932, due to a loss of form.  and made an unsuccessful comeback at New Cross Lambs in 1935.

In later life he was a successful businessman and lived in a house on Stapleford Airfield with his wife Sonja and his children William and Tanya. He was a keen aviator and sailor. He was a friend of Rupert "Bob" Simpson a pilot with BOAC and fellow boating enthusiast  

He suffered from a gastric ulcer and died from cancer of the colon in the 1970s

References

External links
Roger Frogley Photograph

British speedway riders
1908 births
1974 deaths